Watch Hill is an affluent coastal neighborhood and census-designated place in the town of Westerly, Rhode Island. The population was 154 at the 2010 census. It sits at the most-southwestern point in all of Rhode Island. It came to prominence in the late 19th and early 20th century as an exclusive summer resort, with wealthy families building sprawling Victorian-style "cottages" along the peninsula. Watch Hill is characterized by The New York Times as a community "with a strong sense of privacy and of discreetly used wealth," in contrast with "the overpowering castles of the very rich" in nearby Newport.

History 

The area was occupied by Niantic Indians in the 17th century, led by Harman Garrett. Colonists used the hill as an important lookout point during the French and Indian War and the Revolutionary War, hence the community's name. Some landmarks in the village include the Watch Hill Lighthouse, the first of which was built in 1745; 1880s The Flying Horse Carousel, the oldest operating suspended-horse carousel in the United States and a National Historic Landmark; the Ocean House hotel; and the 1916 Olympia Tea Room.

One point of interest in Watch Hill is the ruins of Fort Mansfield, an old coastal artillery post situated at the end of Napatree Point. It was one of a series of such forts constructed to guard the eastern entrance to Long Island Sound as part of the coastal defense network for New York City during the Spanish–American War. It was in operation between 1901 and 1909, then was closed down over the course of several years. The land was sold in 1926, and all the government buildings were demolished during the winter of 1928–29. The three concrete gun emplacements were left behind and remain there to this day, offering tunnels and underground rooms to explore. Occasionally at low tide, some remains can be seen of the Battery Connell.

Fort Road connected Watch Hill to Fort Mansfield, but the Hurricane of 1938 wiped it out and destroyed 39 houses, the Yacht and Beach Clubs, and a bathing pavilion. Fifteen people were killed and others survived by clinging to wreckage, as they were swept across the bay to Connecticut. Several breachways were created in Napatree Point after the hurricane passed. To this day, Sandy Point remains an island, rather than the northern extension of Napatree. The shortened Napatree Point is now a barrier beach without any roads or houses. It is open to the public, and offers bird watching and surf casting.

Geography 
Watch Hill sits at the most southwestern point of Rhode Island on a stubby peninsula jutting into Block Island Sound. It includes a smaller peninsula known as Napatree Point, a -long sandy spit that extends west from the Watch Hill business district, and Sandy Point, which was once attached to Napatree Point. Both Napatree and Sandy Point shelter Little Narragansett Bay and have made Watch Hill a popular harbor around which the business district has grown.

Watch Hill is a two-hour drive from Boston and a three-hour drive from New York City. On clear days, there are views of Montauk, New York to the south and Block Island, Rhode Island to the southeast.

According to the United States Census Bureau, the CDP has a total area of 0.82 square miles (2.11 km), of which 0.80 square miles (2.08 km) is land and 0.014 square miles (0.036 km) (1.72%) is water.

Culture 

According to The New York Times, Watch Hill was historically home to "a select group of wealthy families" whose lives revolved around "golf and tennis at the Misquamicut Club, bathing and yachting at the Watch Hill Yacht Club, and tea and cocktails at Ocean House and Watch Hill's other grand hotels." Wealthy families built sprawling Victorian-style "cottages" along the peninsula. The village was known as "a somewhat staid and family-oriented community compared to glittering Newport, Rhode Island's other, more famous summer colony." Famous guests to the seaside resort included Albert Einstein, Douglas Fairbanks, Douglas Fairbanks Jr., Groucho Marx, David Niven and Jean Harlow. Stephen Birmingham described Watch Hill as "an Andorra of Victoriana on the New England shore."

For several generations, the community has maintained its "old-money summer colony" atmosphere, even as traditional summer communities have developed, namely Nantucket, Martha's Vineyard, and the Hamptons. New England traditions are evident in the popular hobbies of its residents, such as golf, sailing, and tennis, as well as the "privacy-loving, multigenerational families tucked into century-old shingled houses", with the majority being passed down in families for several generations. The New York Times notes that "Watch Hill impresses visitors with a strong sense of privacy and of discreetly used wealth—the rambling, old-fashioned, turreted and gingerbreaded Victorian summer houses with piazzas and softly rolling lawns have little in common with the overpowering castles of the very rich in Newport, a place rarely mentioned in Watch Hill even though it is barely 30 miles distant."

The waterfront was once lined with huge Victorian hotels. However, fire and hurricanes destroyed almost all during the 20th century. The two remaining hotels are the Ocean House and the Watch Hill Inn; both went through major renovations during the 2000s. The Ocean House was originally opened in 1868; it was torn down in 2005, then completely rebuilt and reopened in 2010. The Ocean House today consists of both hotel rooms and condominiums. It is the only Forbes Five-Star and AAA Five Diamond Hotel in Rhode Island and has been described by The New York Times as a place which "conjures up another age, when women wore white gloves to tea and golf was a newfangled pastime." Celebrities have holidayed at the hotel, including Hugh Jackman and Regis Philbin.

The village is listed as a census-designated place. Watch Hill Historic District is a  historic district in the village that is listed on the U.S. National Register of Historic Places. As a state-charted Fire District (1901), the Watch Hill area is authorized to tax residents to fund their volunteer fire department, but the bulk of property taxes go to the town to fund municipal services and schools.

Notable people
Notable current and former residents of Watch Hill include: 
 Taylor Swift, singer-songwriter
 Conan O'Brien, television host
 Andrew Mellon (1855–1937), banker, industrialist and Secretary of the Treasury
 Henry Ford (1863–1947), business magnate and founder of Ford Motor
 Clark Gable (1901–1960), film actor
 Rebekah Harkness (1915–1982), Standard Oil heiress and founder of the Harkness Ballet; former owner of Swift’s residence

See also 
National Register of Historic Places listings in Washington County, Rhode Island

References

 Einstein: The Life and Times, by Ronald W. Clark

External links

 Watch Hill Fire District
 Watch Hill Fire Department
 Watch Hill Lighthouse 
 Visit Watch Hill (Tourism site)
 The Greater-Westerly Pawcatuck Chamber of Commerce
 Town of Westerly

Census-designated places in Washington County, Rhode Island
Historic districts in Washington County, Rhode Island
Westerly, Rhode Island
Villages in Washington County, Rhode Island
Providence metropolitan area
Villages in Rhode Island
Census-designated places in Rhode Island
Historic districts on the National Register of Historic Places in Rhode Island
Populated coastal places in Rhode Island